is an anime-influenced television series created by Ciro Nieli.

The Hyperforce 
  (voiced by Greg Cipes) is an average teenage boy, with no confirmed age, but has a birthday in episode ten of season 1. His last name was never seen or revealed. His hair is black and his eyes are blue. He is initially hesitant in accepting his role as leader of the Hyperforce, but gradually comes to accept his destiny of becoming a defender of Shuggazoom and later the universe. He pilots Torso Tank Driver 1, which forms the torso and limbs of the Super Robot. His girlfriend is Jinmay and the pair remain together throughout the series. Chiro's powers come from the Power Primate entity inside him. In the final scenes of Season 4, Chiro leads the Monkey Team and their allies against the army of the Skeleton King.
  (voiced by Kevin Michael Richardson) is the black monkey (later silver in seasons three and four), and the team's second-in-command. Antauri is very calm, collected and cares much for his friends. He often acts as a leader and is serious about training. He's not a big fan of video games, and he's a vegetarian. He teaches Chiro how to control the Power Primate, and also gives spiritual advice to the rest of the Team. His closest friends are Gibson and Sparx. He spends most of his time either meditating or patrolling Shuggazoom City. He pilots the Brain Scrambler Pilot 2, which forms the head of the Super Robot. His main weapon is his Ghost Claws, which were actually the parts from a machine called the Ghost-Claw Projector (also the name of one of his attacks as well).
  (Full name: SPRX-77) (voiced by Corey Feldman) is the red monkey, and the team's comedian. He has a bit of a big ego but is very brave, smart and willing to protect his comrades, especially Nova, who he is shown to have feelings for in a few episodes especially. In "Circus of Ooze", it is revealed that Sparx became a Human cannonball. He pilots the Fist Rocket 3, which becomes the right hand of the Super Robot. His main weapon is his Magnet Hands, which, according to flashbacks in "Golden Age", were actually the parts from a machine called the Magna-Ball Blazer (also the name of one of his attacks as well). In the last two episodes of the series, Sparx turned evil, helping Mandarin and Valina collect the objects need to resurrect Skeleton King. During the ritual, Sparx almost killed Nova, but her kind words to him brought him back long enough to be purified by the others Power Primates. He tried to stop Skeleton King but it was too late.but  under Chiro's consolation Make him feel more refreshed and with Chiro and others Monkey Team friends with their allies against the army of the Skeleton King.
  (Full name: Mr. Hal Gibson) (voiced by Tom Kenny) is the blue monkey, and the team's science officer and medic. Gibson relies on cold hard logic and facts (and even advanced planning at times) and is easily panicked, however, he never lets this get in the way of his duties to the team and Shuggazoom. He pilots the Fist Rocket 4, which becomes the left hand of the Super Robot. His main weapon is his Driller Hands.
  (voiced by Clancy Brown) is the green monkey and the team's mechanic. Otto is a more fun-loving monkey that doesn't always understand the point behind being formal. Although his childlike attitude may make him appear to be dim-witted, Otto is a mechanical genius, able to build and design complex machines and weapons with barely any thought. His main weapon is his Energy Saw Hands. He pilots the Foot Crusher Cruiser 5 which forms the left foot of the Super Robot.
  (voiced by Kari Wahlgren) is the yellow monkey, and the team's only female member before Jinmay in season 3. Although she may be the smallest on the team (a full 2 3/4 inches shorter than Sparx, the second shortest), her size is barely even noticed. Nova is the most determined and courageous of the team. As a result of her violent nature, she is known for her short-fused anger, which is usually taken out on Sparx. She despises (maybe even fears) the cold due to a traumatizing training exercise Mandarin put her through back when he was the leader of the Monkey Team. Her main weapon is her Robotic Fists. She pilots the Foot Crusher Cruiser 6 which forms the right foot of the Super Robot.
   (voiced by Ashley Johnson) is a robot girl whom Chiro falls in love with. She becomes an official Hyperforce member and becomes the protector of Shuggazoom when the Hyperforce left to destroy the Dark Worm. She has pink hair and green eyes. She usually wears her green dress with a heart in the front and the back when she was an honorary member. Now she wears the same style as Chiro's but in dress form. When she called for help in Ghosts of Shuggazoom, she was wearing her original dress. Jinmay is the second female on the Hyperforce, right after Nova.

Villains 
 Skeleton King (Real name: The Alchemist) (voiced by Mark Hamill) is an evil undead warlord/sorcerer who resides in the Citadel of Bone, a gigantic living spaceship (resembling Darth Vader's Super Star Destroyer from the Star Wars films) made entirely from bone and filled with nightmarish monsters, in space, and is determined to rule Shuggazoom. He uses the Formless Minions and various other monsters to fight the Monkey Team, and is very interested in finding out what makes Chiro so special, due to his remarkable control of the Power Primate. He is also constantly trying to corrupt the monkeys for unknown reasons (perhaps it is because the feelings he has for them stayed with him after the Dark One took over his soul). The Skeleton King later merged with the Dark One, only to have him decapitated by the Hyperforce. Later, Antauri cut off the Skeleton King's skull from the Worm which then floated off into space and was later retrieved by Mandarin. After acquiring the skull, along with the Alchemist's robe, the Ice Crystal of Vengeance, the Fire of Hate and the Soul of Evil, the Skull Sorceress used them to resurrect the Skeleton King into a more powerful and frightening form resembling a skeletal combination of Darth Vader and Sidious. He then recreated his empire and his army and was last seen about to lead them all into a final assault on Shuggazoom.
 Mandarin (voiced by James Hong) was the infamous orange monkey, and the Hyperforce's original leader. He is currently different than the other monkeys who are part robot (though he once was as seen in flashbacks during "Secret of the Sixth Monkey" and "Snowbound"), which explains why he has orange gauntlets to emit his energy sword and shield. He also has armor. He wanted to not only protect Shuggazoom but rule it as well. His teammates did not like this, so as a last resort they banished him to an off-world prison called the Hostile Outlaw Observation Prison (in the shape of a hoop), where he remained in a stasis-induced sleep until the signal emitted by his shield (activated by Chiro) awakened him from his dreams of the deaths of his former teammates ("countless fantasies played out in the black sleep of stasis", as he puts it). Once, he even replicated several clones of Chiro using Chiro's DNA and molecular structure, however he failed miserably and Skeleton King replaced him with a more obedient clone; afterwards, Skeleton King orders his formless minions to take the original Mandarin away (the original Mandarin's whereabouts remain unknown). In "Night of Fear", it is revealed that his biggest fear is the Skull Sorceress, despite managing to silence her when she is still trapped in the medallion.
 Skull Sorceress (Real name: Valina Sheenko, also spelled Valeena) (voiced by Hynden Walch) was a member of the Skeletal Circle, a secret group of Shuggazoom citizens who worshipped the Skeleton King. The leaders, Ma and Pa Sheenko, were her loving yet somewhat critical parents who chose her to accept Skeleton King's power. Skeleton King's influence saw her fit to rule the Savage Lands, which is a large, hidden jungle which lied in a series of caves beneath the surface of Shuggazoom. She is an evil, beautiful and powerful sorceress, with the ability to summon the Dark One. She can create bubbles, teleport, steal souls, and hurl deadly energy blasts. When the Monkey Team and Jinmay attempted to rescue Chiro from the Skeleton King's jungle hidden beneath the badlands, Valina attempted to kidnap Jinmay, and the rescued Chiro and the rest of the Monkey Team chased after her. She then summoned the Dark One in an attempt to destroy the Monkey Team. When the Dark One was injured by Antauri, she lost her power, and was defeated by Chiro. She was tossed into a vat of formless ooze as the savage lands and the jungle beneath it were destroyed. The Skull Sorceress returned early in Season 4 only to wind up trapped in a medallion which comes under Mandarin's possession in the same episode. When Mandarin abused her power to create the Monkey Team's worst fears, she trapped him and wanted to use the Skeleton King's skull to resurrect him. She and Mandarin did, finally, resurrect the Skeleton King at the end of Season 4, but instead of rewarding her, he killed her with a powerful energy blast that reduced her to ashes (though Chiro tried to prevent this).
 Formless Minions: Also called "Bone Drones". The Formless Minions are the black skeleton-like creatures that are created from some kind of black ooze and act as the foot soldiers of the Skeleton King's army. The Formless Minions are known to ride on motorcycles during their attacks on Shuggazoom, transform their hands into various weapons, and amass themselves into a gigantic monster to attack The Super Robot. They strongly resemble the foot soldiers from the Super Sentai and Power Rangers television series, particularly the oozemen from Mighty Morphin Power Rangers: The Movie.

There are various versions of the Formless, some of which include: 

 the regular Formless Soldier
 the Hyperformless - a batch of Formless in the five colours of the Robot Monkeys, created to counteract the powers of the Hyperforce. (The Black Hyperformless shoots massive spikes from its chest; the Red Hyperformless uses gigantic battle cuffs for hands; the Blue Hyperformless welds sharp blade-like hands for combat; the Green Hyperformless uses its gigantic hammer-shaped head to crush foes; the Yellow Hyperformless uses massive cleated boots to stomp its enemies.) They we’re destroyed when the Monkey Team used new moves.
 the Red Crystal-bearing Formless Soldier - one which can shoot fireballs and regenerate from their wounds; the much-stronger  Formless type
 the Formless Chiro Clones
 the Formless Chiro Mutants - hybrids of Chiro and various animals
 Chira and Chiru - two muscular female versions of Chiro; Chiru refers to her fellow clone as a sister, implying familiality, and they are referred to as twins by their creator as well
 Chiro Blob - a gruesome growing mass in Chiro's likeness
 Formless Slugs
 Winged Formless
 Giant Formless
 Formless Spider
 Formless Sea Serpent
 Formless Tyrannosaurus
 Primitive Formless, a kind of Neanderthal-like Formless that adapted to the harsh jungle settings of the Savage Lands and serve as Valeena's guardians.
 Formless Magma, volcanic magma/lava utilized by the Skeleton King.

 TV Monster / Skeleton King Droid: (voiced by Mark Hamill) A black and bulky looking, yet powerful robot made to personally serve Skeleton King as his herald. In Season 1, as Skeleton King could not leave the Citadel of Bone, the TV Monster did his work, carrying his essence wherever it needed to go. It has a large monitor at its center, on which Skeleton King was screened. It was defeated at the end of Season 1, and was not seen until late Season 2, where it was blown away from the Citadel of Bone, but apparently not destroyed. It returned in early Season 3, abducted by an infected robot mind who was bent on destroying everything that ever had contact with Skeleton King. No longer able to ferry Skeleton King's essence around, the TV Monster fused itself with the remnants of the robot mind instead, becoming the Skeleton King Droid (or Skeleton Droid). All its attacks were upgraded, and it became undefeatable. It can take out lasers from every part of itself, transform into a ball, and fly at incredible speeds. At the end of Season 3, it was destroyed by the Super Robot. Mandarin recovered it, and now uses it as a ship.
 Elevator Monster: (voiced by Clancy Brown) A psychic being that serves the Skeleton King. It lures people into its elevator in the episode "Pit of Doom". It looks like an old man, but is able to combine itself with the elevator. Its teleporting ability gave it an advantage against the Monkey Team for a while, until Sprx finally defeated the monster with his Magna-Tingler Blast. The Elevator Monster made an appearance in "In the Grip of Evil" along with other defeated villains.
 Gyrus Krinkle: (voiced by Jeffrey Combs) A sad, lonely man who grew up with an unloving robot mother that he presumably built himself (he even admits to Chiro that her heart was made of polyurethane, invoking this theory). He has dark blue hair, light blue skin, a turkey-like crooked neck, and a big nose. He is a big fan of the Hyperforce, and this fanaticism eventually turned into an obsession. Krinkle was originally part of the cleanup crew that cleaned the city after the team's battles with monsters, but was then fired because he was cleaning the Super Robot instead of the city, on the grounds of "excessive creepiness" because his boss felt that his fanaticism was becoming an unhealthy obsession. Krinkle, although an amazing technical genius and mastermind, is also completely mentally unstable. His failed attempt to join the Hyperforce led him to sneak into the Super Robot in a Chiro costume and hypnotize the Monkey Team into fighting the real Chiro, who at the time was in a robot suit. Chiro finally managed to free the Monkey Team from their waking dream state, and tricked Krinkle into thinking he was part of the team. When captured, Krinkle was sent to Moonbase Theta Prison Complex on Ranger 7, where he was last seen to be talking to the Hyperforce about their purported adventures together only to be shocked out of his thoughts by one of the security robots, who angrily orders him to keep it down or he will be placed into stasis; long after the robot is gone, however, he resumes - revealing to the audience that he is in a white padded room talking to himself. He was not seen again until Season 4, when he had taken over the facility and had captured Chiro in his mind using a matter-to-brainwave conversion device he invented called the Neuro-Matter Reconfigutron. When he sent the Monkey Team into his mental world, they managed to shatter it by attacking fissures that appeared when he got angry. They were sent back to the facility and Krinkle disappeared into the Neuro-Matter Reconfigutron seconds before the machine exploded. Whether or not Krinkle is alive or if he is trapped inside the machine is unknown. It's also revealed in this episode that he also enjoys painting; he paints a picture of a large-eyed dog which, after his apparent death, becomes a picture of himself and the Hyperforce (sans Chiro) in action poses.
 Professor Maezono: (voiced by Dee Bradley Baker) A now disembodied brain, Professor Maezono was a human that was one of the creators of the Super Robot. He secretly built many varying models of the Super Robot for his own evil needs. When the Prometheus Five (Slingshot) was created as the last generation of Super Robots, he tried to fuse his consciousness with the robot. When his 'friend' Dr. Takeuchi tried to stop him, the Professor's brain triggered an explosion that destroyed his lab and Dr. Takeuchi. From then on, he was locked in combat with Slingshot, who vowed to avenge Dr. Takeuchi's death. When the Monkey Team came to the planet, Maezono tricked them into trying to destroy Slingshot. Slingshot soon turned them right, but Prof. Maezono escaped. Slingshot is now chasing him across the galaxy trying to destroy him.
 Sakko: (voiced by Tom Kenny) Sakko is a tiny, girly-looking monkey. He may be cute, but he is actually a spy for Skeleton King. He was the first agent of Skeleton King seen in the show, but was soon 'taken away'. He returned at the end of Season 1, partnering up with Mandarin. After he and Mandarin abandoned Skeleton King, he was not seen again until Season 4, where it was revealed that he currently resides in the prison on Ranger 7.
 Flytor: (voiced by Tom Kenny) Being a union of three monsters of the Skeleton King, Flytor is a combination of a mutated fly, crab and plant. He possess a sonic scream and his able to fly very fast. He is one of the Skeleton King more dangerous monster and was created for the purpose to scan Chiro's genetic blueprint to find out what made Chiro so special. In the Episode The Skeleton King Threat, it was discovered that Flytor was created from a fourth monster, a gigantic man with a huge pimple on his head and a powerful energy blast that can turn people bald. Flytor was seen in "In the Grip of Evil".
 Biff Beefy Box / Cloggy Colon Creature: (voiced by Kevin Michael Richardson) Also known as Captain Beefy Box, a seemingly friendly alien is the manager and mascot of Wonder Fun Meat World, an intergalactic fast food restaurant chain. But in truth, Biff Beefy Box's real form is Cloggy Colon Creature, a gigantic Anthropomorphic Colon monster that wants to get people fat with its meat products so it can devour them, as humans are the "ultimate fast food" on his home planet (monkeys are a delicacy there as well). It arrives at Shuggazoom City with its store of meat (and meat characters: Big Meat Cone, Meat-cicle, etc.) Eating the meat hypnotizes people so they continue eating more and more, like an obsession, making the human (and monkey) body complacent to its power. In the end, its plan was discovered and its true form revealed. It was defeated by the not-eaten Shugazoomians and launched into the sun by the Super Robot. The Cloggy Colon Creature made an appearance in Season 4, where it was revealed that he currently resides in the prison on Ranger 7 with Sakko. However, before that, he was mentioned by Antauri (along with Cheese-Bot) in "A Man Named Krinkle".
 Scrapperton: (voiced by Eric Idle and later by Jeff Bennett) Also known as Duke Scrapperton, Grand Earl of the Mecha Realm. A once mortal man that "upgraded" (actually, "replaced") every part of his body with a mechanical version (wonders of steam technology as he puts it), Scrapperton is a kindly-seeming robo-man, but he works for Skeleton King. He collects mostly useless junk, but his collecting habits can get in the way of his mind. He lured the Monkeys to his lair by capturing Sprx, and soon stole all of their hands and hand attachments. He later made robot apes that worshiped the monkeys in order to trick them into joining him, and was taken by the robot apes when they left the city at the end of the episode, after having escaped from under the influence of his mind control chips. He returned in the episode "In the Grip of Evil" (walking past Otto, Gibson and Sprx before entering the elevator monster which then disappeared), as did most villains from the show.
 Morlath: (voiced by Kevin Michael Richardson) Also known as The Mythic Lord of The Northern Ice, this gigantic frost demon was trapped in a cavern in the Sea of Ice outside of Shuggazoom City until he encounters Skeleton King who offers to free him if he lends his power to freeze the city. Later Skeleton King reveals that his true intention to free Morlath was to capture him and use Morlath's ice magic for himself. Later in season 4, when Valeena, Mandarin and The Hyperforce went on their search to find The Ice crystal of Vengeance, the second element to resurrect Skeleton King, Morlath was returned in the same cavern. But now Morlath was mobile and guarding the Ice Crystal so that Skeleton King would be a prisoner in his power as Morlath was a prisoner and engaged them in battle to prevent the crystal from leaving. His fate was sealed when the Super Robot destroys his cavern with the melting frost demon inside.
 The Curator: An eccentric yet creepy owner of the possibly "haunted" Shuggazoom History Museum that has been closed for years until the Hyperforce got their own exhibit for their heroic deeds. He believes history is most interesting when "evil triumpths over good", and has several ancestors to support that belief (a medieval knight that took several innocent lives in witch trials, a western outlaw that wiped a town off the map, and a caveman that's possibly responsible for dinosaurs going extinct, just to name a few). In attempt to make sure he goes down in history himself, the Curator turns the museum and its exhibits into a hub of pocket-dimension so copies of his anscestors and several ancient torture devices could destroy the Hyperforce, but the whole plan eventually backfires on him when his creations are defeated and he ends up in a pocket dimension of modern Shuggazoom City that formed from the newest exhibit, while the Hyperforce, thanks to Antauri, found the real exit... upon returning to the present (and reality for that matter), a new figurine of the Curator is found in the Hyperforce Exhibit, showing he got what he wanted in an eternal prison.
 Ma and Pa Sheenko: (voiced by Kari Wahlgren and Clancy Brown) The leaders of the Skeletal Circle, and Valina's loving yet somewhat critical parents who chose her to accept Skeleton King's power.
 The Dark Ones: A species of evil entities with the power to destroy creation that were created by an unknown cosmic force when the universe was young. While many were confined in the Netherworld, some of them are dormant in their planets' cores. They have so much evil that any organic life is painfully weakened in the Netherworld.

Allies

The Sun Riders 
(Super Quasar voiced by Keone Young, Aurora Six voiced by Meredith Salenger, Johnny Sunspot voiced by Tom Kenny) A fictional superhero team with three members: Super Quasar, the leader of the Sun Riders who performs Solar Helmet Hot Shot, an attack which he shoots a consecrated beam of solar energy from his helmet's visors. Aurora Six is the ravishing female of the group that uses the Sun Gun, a weapon that shoots sun beams that stuns her enemies in a main attack called Sun Gun Dazzle Stun. And Johnny Sunspot is the kid sidekick genius (who builds all of the team's weapons) that wields special gloves that create dark energy orbs in an attack called Black Hole Blackout (later Black Hole Barrage in his second appearance). When they join hands, the Sun Riders perform Super Solar Strike, a destructive team attack that's similar to a solar flare. The Sun Riders are known to ride on their Sun Cycles, and their own robot is called the Nebutron, an orblike Super Robot that is heavily armed. They have their television series, of which Chiro is an avid fan. However, they wanted to stop pretending, and in exchange for real power, joined the Skeleton King in the promise of destroying Chiro and the Monkey Team. They later return in Season 2, in the episode "The Sun Riders Return", apparently reformed and with a more powerful Nebutron ship - which they later sacrifice for the good of others. Aurora Six appeared as an aspect of the Dreamlands in a later episode, "In the Grip of Evil", and in the last scene of "Soul of Evil." The Sun Riders ware last seen on screen as three the allies that will aid the Hyperforce in the last battle against the resurrected Skeleton King and his army of the undead.

Slingshot 
(voiced by Scott Menville) Also known as Prometheus Five, the fifth and most recent in a series of robots of which the Super Robot is the first. As his name implies, beyond standard flight abilities, Slingshot can create energy balls from his hands and use them to propel himself forward at high speed, causing him to move fast enough to puncture even the toughest of metals. Shortly after Slingshot was completed, one of his creators, Professor Maezono, attempted to transplant his own brain into Slingshot's robotic shell as a means of becoming the ultimate death machine. However, his partner, Dr. Takeuchi, removed the power cord during the process as a means of stopping him. The resulting overload caused a massive explosion, killing Dr. Takauchi and reducing Professor Maezono to a disembodied brain. Slingshot blames Maezono for Takauchi's death, and has been battling the mad professor, who wants to see him destroyed, ever since. Unlike the Super Robot, Slingshot is capable of using human speech (although he can hear, understand and translate the silent speech of the Super Robot).

Planetoid Q 
(voiced by Clancy Brown) A living planetesimal with a jack o' lantern-esque face, ordered by the Skeleton King to collide with Shuggazoom. Later, it is convinced by Chiro to make its own decisions and do what it wants instead of listening to the Skeleton King's commands. Planetoid Q appeared as an aspect of the Dreamlands in a later episode.

The Circus of Ooze Crew 
(The Ringmaster voiced by Robert Englund, Leeah the Jungle Girl voiced by Kari Wahlgren) While this traveling circus was cruising the galaxy, they had a run-in with the Citadel of Bone. It shot formless ooze into the train, which Made All the members Evil. The members include the ringmaster, Leeah the jungle girl, and the clowns. They turned for Shuggazoom, and attempted to use the ooze to turn all the citizens of Shuggazoom City into clown slaves, and that included Chiro, who was scared of clowns. They tried to make the monkeys part of the circus, but Otto had no use. When the ringmaster became a giant carousel, Otto did the trapeze and used his saws to cut down the carousel. They gave Otto the starring role in the next show. It is unknown where they are now.

Thingy 
(voiced by Frank Welker) A tiny little fur ball that hailed from an unknown planet. It was rescued by the team on Ranger 7, but turned out to be a trap set by Skeleton King. It can transform into a giant monster, although it is not evil by nature. Its lick is a repellent for Skeleton King's virus. Its fur can also be used in sandwiches. Thingy appeared as an aspect of the Dreamlands in a later episode.

Mobius Quint 
(voiced by Lance Henriksen) A galaxy-class pilot, Quint meets the Hyperforce when the wreckage of his ship The Last Chance is found floating in space, destroyed by fragments of the Citadel. The Hyperforce decides to aid Quint in rescuing his crew from being consumed by the dreaded starship. He briefly falls under the control of the Citadel and becomes consumed with revenge, and takes the Super Robot's neutron generator to try and destroy the Citadel. Chiro got him out in time, and was last seen on screen as one of the allies that will aid the Hyperforce in the last battle against the resurrected Skeleton King and his army of the undead.

Quint's obsession with destroying the Citadel of Bone is similar to Captain Ahab in the novel Moby-Dick.

Captain Shuggazoom 
(voiced by Bruce Campbell) The previous defender of Shuggazoom City whose secret identity was the wealthy Billionaire Playboy industrialist Clayton Carrington.

After defeating his nemesis, Doctor Malicious, who was armed with the Magna Ball-Blazer, Captain Shuggazoom returned the weapon to its creator and personal friend, The Alchemist. As Captain Shuggazoom asked if his Silver Monkey was complete, The Alchemist, who was accompanied by the Monkey Team before cyberization, warned Captain Shuggazoom about the looming threat of The Dark Ones, Transdimensional Demons sealed by the Veran-Mystics thousands of years ago, and took him on his custom-made portal to the Netherworld to monitor their growing forces. Captain Shuggazoom asked if it was dangerous to have an open portal functional, The Alchemist reassured him by saying that the Containment Grid surrounding the portal was completely impenetrable. As Captain Shuggazoom left to respond to a distress call, Mandarin damaged the containment grid, which released a gigantic hand that grabbed and attacked The Alchemist, and a Demon Beast which escaped the lab to terrorize Shuggazoom City.

Forced to abandon his alien date as Clayton to battle the Demon Beast, it nearly opened a portal to the Netherworld to unleash it brethren, which Captain Shuggazoom barely averted. Clearly out-matched, Captain Shuggazoom returned to The Alchemist's Lab for aid, and discovered that The Alchemist was aging. He explained that The Portal was damaged, which led to The Demon Beast's release, and he was changed upon contact from The Dark Ones. Grabbing the Sleep Cannon, Captain Shuggazoom promised to return soon, and engaged The Dark One in a final battle. As the Demon Beast began to attack Captain Shuggazoom, he used the weapon on the monster and successfully put it to hibernation. He got caught in the blast as well, and fell with the monster into a cavern below.

60 years later, he was discovered when Hyperforce picked up his heat signature coming from inside the cavern while searching for Mandarin and the Skull Sorceress. They went down to investigate, believing it to be Skull Sorceress, but were shocked instead find an old man sleeping in suspended animation and wearing a helmet exactly like their emblem. After reviving the man (who was revealed to be Captain Shuggazoom himself) by setting the Sleep Cannon to reverse polarity, the captain was shocked to see himself as an old man. However, after telling the Hyperfoce everything he remembered, Captain Shuggazoom assumed the world lives on since the dimensional portal was closed for all this time, and wondered about the condition of the Alchemist. Antauri sadly states that The Alchemist was completely corrupted by The Dark Ones, and Nova stated that the very reason that The Monkey Team was created was to protect the Universe from him. Meanwhile, Gibson remembered that the captain said the Demon Beast was imprisoned with him, so Otto looked at the Sleep Cannon and discovered that its reverse polarity had a one-mile radius and accidentally awoken the Demon Beast to resume its purpose. Hoping to redeem himself after believing that he abandoned The Alchemist in his hour in need, Captain Shuggazoom joined The Hyperforce to stop The Demon Beast's rampage, only to find The Super Robot overwhelmed by the Demon Beast's strength. The Demon Beast had Captain Shuggazoom in its mouth, and the beast started to reopen the dimensional rift. Determined to not fail The Hyperforce as he failed The Alchemist, Captain Shuggazoom successfully fired The Sleep Cannon from within The Demon Beast and escaped from its jaws, leaving The Super Robot to use Lazertron Fury to push the sleeping Dark One back to the rift, thus sealing it from within.

After the dramatic battle, Captain Shuggazoom decides to leave The Hyperforce and return to The Alchemist's Laboratory to find out what happened to him during his final days for his peace of mind. While exploring the Laboratory, He discovered The Alchemist's final computerized message. During the final stages of his metamorphosis from living to undead The Alchemist says that the Monkey Team is now complete and it's their task to stop the evil he's unleashed before it's too late. "Now The Dark Ones take my soul!" was The Alchemist's final chilling line as his transformation to the Skeleton King was finally compete. Kneeling before the Alchemist's robe, he apologized for abandoning him in his time of need, when he was attacked by Valina and Mandarin. Captain Shuggazoom fought bravely to keep the robe from Mandarin's hands only to be blasted by Valina. Badly beaten, Captain Shuggazoom mentally called Antauri, which brought the Hyperforce to his aid. Before passing out, Captain Shuggazoom warned the team that Mandarin and Valina took The Alchemist's robe and went to see Morlath, The Mythic Lord of The Northern Ice, and are planning to resurrect The Skeleton King. He is currently recuperating in the Super Robot's Healing Chamber and it is unknown that if he will join The Hyperforce in the final battle against the newly reborn Skeleton King and his army of the Undead.

It is noted that Captain Shuggazoom has a strong mental connection to Antauri.

The Alchemist 
(voiced by Mark Hamill) A mysterious, yet kind man who fuses Science and Magic for the betterment of mankind. The Alchemist encountered The Hyperforce during their visit to the Dreamlands, and offered to guide them to an exit while fending off Skeleton King. When the Monkey Team made their way through the underground doorway, they all witnessed a flashback of the Alchemist in a laboratory, standing near six tubes containing six baby monkeys that instantly aged to adulthood when he pulled the switch. The Alchemist later created robotic exoskeletons and personalized weapons for each monkey. After the construction of the Monkey Team was completed, the Alchemist initiated a memory erase so that the Hyperforce could not remember their origin. When the Hyperforce confronted the Alchemist on why he did this, he explained "Because of what I was becoming. I created you to protect the universe from a great evil...Myself!" and transformed into Skeleton King, confirming that the Alchemist was his former human identity.

The Alchemist later appeared in the Savage Lands as recorded messages in his abandoned laboratory that explained to a then-primitive Chiro that he created the Monkey Team in that spot to combat an evil beyond imagination. In the message, The Alchemist aided Chiro in rebuilding the powerful Silver Monkey body, which required living energy to function properly and wield the Power Primate.

The Alchemist was also mentioned in Prototype as one of the Three Creators of the Super Robot, who, along with Professor Maezono and Dr. Takeuchi, helped in the creation of the Super Robot but vanished along with the Super Robot after its completion. The Alchemist was also the close friend of Captain Shuggazoom, Shuggazoom city's previous defender who tried to warn him of the looming threat of the Dark Ones, the transdimensional demons sealed by the Veran-Mystics thousands of years ago, and showed him his custom-made portal to the Netherworld to monitor their growing forces.

Captain Shuggazoom asked was it dangerous to have an open portal to Netherworld functional, the Alchemist reassured him by saying that the Containment Grid surrounding the portal was completely impenetrable. As Captain Shuggazoom left to respond to a distress call, Mandarin damaged the containment grid, releasing a gigantic hand that grabbed and attacked the Alchemist, as well as unleash a Demon Beast, which escaped the lab to terrorize Shuggazoom City. Captain Shuggazoom returned to The Alchemist's Lab for aid, and discovered that the Alchemist was aging rapidly. He explained that the Portal was damaged which led to the Demon Beast's release, and he was changed upon contact from the Dark Ones, and is slowly being transformed by their malevolent influence. Grabbing the Sleep Cannon, Captain Shuggazoom promised to return soon, in which the Alchemist response was "I certainly hope so Captain, at least to say good bye." as he began to transform into Skeleton King.

The Alchemist was last mentioned in a final computerized message discovered by Captain Shuggazoom. During the final stages of his metamorphosis, the Alchemist says that the Monkey Team is now complete, and it's their task to stop the evil he's unleashed before it's too late. "Now The Dark Ones take my soul!" was the Alchemist's final chilling line as his transformation to the Skeleton King was finally complete.

The Alchemist is shown to have special bond with Nova before his transformation into Skeleton King, and often called her "Dearest Nova" or "Dear Nova". In fact, he had a special bond with all his beloved monkeys (even Mandarin), who he felt were his children.

Master Offay 
(voiced by Makoto Iwamatsu) Also known as the Hard Master due to sounding strict, Master Offay runs an interplanetary dojo on the Planet Galaxia and was Nova's former martial arts trainer. The Hyperforce meets him on their quest to destroy The Skeleton King Worm and discovered that Galaxia was corrupted by the Dark One's passage, turing all of its inhabitants into mindless battle crazed monsters that fight in The Monster Battle Club, a vicious and brutal tournament. When Chiro becomes infected by Galaxia's corrupted atmosphere, Master Offay helps Chiro to control his new savage monster form by training him in the ancient ways of Monster Fighting, where a still spirit can conquer any obstacle. When Chiro defeats all off the contestants of the Monster Battle Club, he learns that the Warlord, the head champion who created the tournament is Master Offay, whose mind was warped by The Skeleton King Worm's power. To bring Master Offay to his true senses, Chiro uses Master Offay's teachings and The Power Primate to subdue him. Master Offay was last seen on screen as one of the allies that will aid the Hyperforce in the last battle against the resurrected Skeleton King and his army of the undead.

Olliana 
(voiced by Tara Strong) First seen in episode 40 Galactic Smash Space Attack, Olliana asks for the teams help to stop an evil gamer called Commodore (voiced by Arthur Burghardt) whose mission is to destroy as many planets as he can to get the highest score in an interstellar game called "Galactic Smash" (Hence the episode name.) She, like many other allies, is seen aiding the team in the last scene of the last episode.

Shuggazoom Citizens 
 BT and Glenny (voiced by Tom Kenny and Greg Cipes): Two teens that know Chiro from preseries, it is unclear if they are friends or bullies of him.
 Mr. Gackslapper (voiced by Clancy Brown): Mr. Gackslapper is a cook who owns a fast-food restaurant called "Hoverburgers", where he cooks levitating burgers.
 Nerd Kid and Mr. Cheepers (voiced by Tom Kenny): A man in red glasses and his stuffed penguin, he is seen the most out of the side characters and has the most dialog (mostly to his penguin). Although his name is never said during the series, a group of fans have taken to calling him "Ned".

Super Robot
Disney Television Animation characters
C